Simon Stewart (born 1 November 1973) was an English football defender.

References

Since 1888... The Searchable Premiership and Football League Player Database (subscription required)

1973 births
Living people
English footballers
Association football defenders
Premier League players
Sheffield Wednesday F.C. players
Shrewsbury Town F.C. players
Fulham F.C. players
Woking F.C. players
Kingstonian F.C. players